A list of notable electroacoustic music, experimental electronic, electronic noise music, electronic sound art, and acousmatic composers:

A-C

D-I

J-O

P-T

U-Z

Acousmatic